John Hutchins (July 25, 1812 – November 20, 1891) was an American lawyer and politician who served two terms as a U.S. Representative from Ohio from 1859 to 1863.

Life and career
Hutchins was born in Vienna Township, Trumbull County, Ohio. He was a first cousin of future congressman Wells A. Hutchins. He attended the district schools and Western Reserve College, known now as Case Western Reserve University, in Cleveland, Ohio. He studied law with David Tod, later Ohio Governor. 
He was admitted to the bar in 1837 and commenced practice in Warren, Ohio.

He served as clerk of the common pleas court for Trumbull County from 1838–43, and was a member of the State house of representatives in 1849 and 1850. He served as the mayor of Warren for two years, and was a member of the Warren Board of Education for six years.  He later formed a partnership with Jacob Dolson Cox

Hutchins was elected as a Republican to the Thirty-sixth and Thirty-seventh Congresses (March 4, 1859–March 3, 1863). He served as chairman of the Committee on Manufacturers (Thirty-seventh Congress). He was an unsuccessful candidate for renomination in 1862, and subsequently resumed the practice of law in Warren.

He moved to Cleveland, Ohio, in 1868 and continued the practice of law. He died there on November 20, 1891, and was interred in Lake View Cemetery.

He married Rhoda M Andrews in 1838, who died in Cleveland in May, 1890. She had three sons and two daughters, three sons and one daughter survived their parents.

Sources

1812 births
1891 deaths
People from Vienna Township, Trumbull County, Ohio
Case Western Reserve University alumni
Ohio lawyers
Politicians from Cleveland
Burials at Lake View Cemetery, Cleveland
Republican Party members of the Ohio House of Representatives
Mayors of places in Ohio
19th-century American politicians
Lawyers from Cleveland
19th-century American lawyers
Republican Party members of the United States House of Representatives from Ohio